Cistus palmensis is a shrubby species of flowering plant in the family Cistaceae.

Phylogeny
Cistus palmensis belongs to the clade of species with purple and pink flowers (the "purple pink clade" or PPC).

References

palmensis